Jacksonia sericea, commonly known as waldjumi, is a species of low-spreading shrub or small tree that occurs in the south west of Western Australia. Found on the Swan Coastal Plain, it grows to 0.6m, has orange flowers from December to February and grows in calcareous and sandy soils. It has a Priority Four classification on the Department of Parks and Wildlife's Declared Rare and Priority Flora List.

References

 
 

Mirbelioids
Fabales of Australia
Rosids of Western Australia
sericea